Silicimonas is a Gram-negative, aerobic and non-motile genus of bacteria from the family of Rhodobacteraceae with one known species, Silicimonas algicola. Silicimonas algicola has been isolated from the diatom Thalassiosira delicatula from France.

References

Rhodobacteraceae
Bacteria genera
Monotypic bacteria genera